Líšný is a municipality and village in Jablonec nad Nisou District in the Liberec Region of the Czech Republic. It has about 300 inhabitants.

Administrative parts
Líšný is made up of village parts of Líšný 1.díl and Líšný 2.díl, and the hamlet of Libentiny.

References

Villages in Jablonec nad Nisou District